St. Michael's Middle and High School (SMMHS) is a seven-year public middle school / high school in St. Michaels, Maryland, United States, in Talbot County. It is one of two public high schools in Talbot County along with Easton High School.

Overview
The school is located on the Eastern Shore of Maryland in the town of St. Michael's, MD, a waterside fishing port on the Chesapeake Bay.  The school is on Maryland Route 33, just west of Easton, Maryland and U.S. 50.

Students
St. Michael's graduation rate has fluctuated a bit over the years, however that may be attributable to the school's small size. In 2007 the school graduated 88.46%, up from 78.69% in 2004.

Like the graduation rate, the school population has been fluctuated over the past several years, with a total of 471 attending in 2016. The school's population peaked in 2000 with 506 students, with a low of 221 in 1993.

Court Case
In Max Brennan v. Board of Education of Talbot County et al., U.S. District Judge George L. Russell III sided with the plaintiff, a transgender male student. Brennan had previously been only authorized to use specified gender neutral bathrooms in his school, St. Michaels Middle/High School. Once a 4th Circuit Court ruling deferred to Obama-era guidance on school bathroom usage, Brennan was then allowed to use the male bathrooms, but not the locker rooms. However, on March 12, 2018, the judge ruled that this amounts to discrimination and "harms his health and well-being...[as the policy] does not apply to anyone else at the high school, and marks him as different for being transgender." Litigation in this case is still ongoing, and no changes to policies have been made.

Sports

State Champions

 2017 - Baseball
 2013 - Tennis
 2012 - Tennis
 2011 - Baseball
 2011 - Tennis
 2010 - Baseball
 2010 - Tennis
 2008 - Baseball
 2001 - Baseball 
 2010 - Wrestling, Jordan Gowe, Individual State Champion (171 lbs.)
 1984 - Wrestling, Ray Carpenter, Individual State Champion 
 1975 - Boys' Soccer 
 1974 - Boys' Soccer

State Finalist

 2018 - Baseball
 2003 - Softball 
 2000 - Baseball
 1997 - Boys' Soccer
 1984 - Boys' Soccer
 1983 - Girls' Field Hockey 
 1982 - Girls' Field Hockey
 1981 - Girls' Field Hockey
 1976 - Boys' Soccer
 1965 - Boys' Cross Country 

State Semi-Finalist

 2016 - Baseball
 2002 - Boys' Soccer
 2002 - Softball
 2000 - Boys' Soccer
 2000 - Softball
 1999 - Boys' Soccer
 1999 - Softball
 1998 - Softball
 1987 - Girls' Field Hockey
 1984 - Girls' Field Hockey
 1982 - Boys' Soccer
 1981 - Boys' Soccer
 1979 - Boys' Soccer
 1977 - Boys' Soccer

Notable alumni
 Harold Baines, former Major League Baseball player
 Jeannie Haddaway - member of the Maryland House of Delegates

See also
List of high schools in Maryland

References and notes

External links
St. Michaels Middle High School website
Map of School from Google Maps

Public high schools in Maryland
Schools in Talbot County, Maryland
Public middle schools in Maryland